The 1963 Campeonato Nacional de Fútbol Profesional, was the 31st season of top-flight football in Chile. Colo-Colo won their ninth title following a 2–1 win against Universidad Católica in the championship last match day on 4 January 1964, also qualifying to the 1964 Copa de Campeones de America.

Final table

Results

Title

Topscorer

Notes

References
RSSSF Page

Primera División de Chile seasons
Chile
1963 in Chilean football